The St. Helena hotspot is a volcanic hotspot located in the southern Atlantic Ocean. It is responsible for the island of St. Helena and the St. Helena Seamount chain. It is one of the oldest known hotspots on Earth, which began to produce basaltic lava about 145 million years ago.

References

Geography of Saint Helena
Hotspots of the Atlantic Ocean
Geology of Saint Helena, Ascension and Tristan da Cunha
Volcanoes of Saint Helena
Mid-Atlantic Ridge